San Paolo Converso is a former Roman Catholic church in Milan, region of Lombardy, Italy, now utilized as a contemporary art space.

History
The church was constructed from 1549-1580 for the convent of the Order of the Angeliche, founded by Countess Ludovica Torelli. It has a nave with barrel vault with a wall dividing the church reserved to the nuns from that for the common faithful, as in conventual churches like in San Maurizio al Monastero Maggiore.

The interior houses canvasses from the Cremonese masters Giulio, Antonio and Vincenzo Campi. The Angelicals were intended to be the female counterpart of the Barnabites and often worked with them during missions. When, in 1552 Pope Paul IV imposed the rule of cloister, Torelli separated from the religious community. With the rule of enclosure, the church was separated into two parts. The work by the Cremonese artists was likely funded by Giulia Sfondrati, of a noble and powerful Cremonese family. The Baroque façade was designed in 1613 by Giovanni Battista Crespi.

The hall of the nuns had once a Pentecost by Simone Peterzano, now in the nearby church of Sant'Eufemia. In 1808, following the suppression of the convents in the Napoleonic era, the monastery was closed, and the church subsequently de-consecrated. It was then used as a warehouse. In 1932 the space was renovated into a concert hall.

The church is now privately owned. The section behind the altar previously reserved for the nuns housed an architectural office from 2014 to 2019. The non-profit Fondazione Converso manages the building as a contemporary art space, organizing exhibitions, events and performances.

References

Roman Catholic churches completed in 1580
16th-century Roman Catholic church buildings in Italy
Baroque architecture in Milan
Paolo Converso